John Hamilton Nunn (born February 3, 1978) is an American race walker. He competed at the 2004 Summer Olympics, finishing in 26th place in the men's 20 km event.  On January 22, 2012, he qualified to represent the U.S. in the 2012 Summer Olympics in the 50km racewalk.  In the Olympics, Nunn finished in 42nd place in a personal best time of 4:03:28.

His personal bests are:  20 km walk 1:22:31, May 8, 2004, in Birštonas, Lithuania and 5 km walk (indoors) 19:26.43 on March 2, 2003, in Boston at the USA Indoor Track and Field Championships.

Nunn is a member of the United States Army. While enlisted, Nunn served as a member of its World Class Athlete Program. Having since left the WCAP, Nunn trained as a physician's assistant and commissioned as an officer in the United States Army. 

Nunn is a member of the Church of Jesus Christ of Latter-day Saints.

Being a professional baker, Nunn used a portion of his baking profits to bring his daughter Ella with him to the Olympics in London.

Personal bests

Achievements

References

External links

Ella's Cookies

1978 births
Living people
American male racewalkers
American Latter Day Saints
Athletes (track and field) at the 2003 Pan American Games
Athletes (track and field) at the 2004 Summer Olympics
Athletes (track and field) at the 2007 Pan American Games
Athletes (track and field) at the 2011 Pan American Games
Athletes (track and field) at the 2012 Summer Olympics
Athletes (track and field) at the 2016 Summer Olympics
Olympic track and field athletes of the United States
People from Durango, Colorado
Track and field athletes from Colorado
World Athletics Championships athletes for the United States
USA Outdoor Track and Field Championships winners
USA Indoor Track and Field Championships winners
Pan American Games track and field athletes for the United States
U.S. Army World Class Athlete Program